Idaho Human Rights Day is a state holiday recognized only in the U.S. state of Idaho.  Governor Cecil Andrus signed compromise legislation on April 10, 1990, making Idaho the nation's 47th state to honor slain civil rights leader Martin Luther King Jr. with an official state holiday.   The holiday, defined by the legislation as Martin Luther King, Jr. - Idaho Human Rights Day, is celebrated on the third Monday in January, the same day as the federal Martin Luther King, Jr. Day holiday, which was first celebrated in 1986.

References

January observances 
Recurring events established in 2006
Idaho culture
Human rights in the United States
Holidays and observances by scheduling (nth weekday of the month)
2006 establishments in Idaho